This is a list of crime films released in 1992.

References

1992